The Al Rashidiya, is a horse race run over a distance of 1,800 metres (nine furlongs) on turf in late January or early February at Meydan Racecourse in Dubai. The race is named after a locality in Eastern Dubai.

It was first run in 2002 Nad Al Sheba Racecourse. It was transferred to Meydan in 2010.

The race distance was 2000 metres for the first two runnings before being reduced to 1800 metres in 2004.

The race began as a Listed event in 2002. The race was elevated to Group 3 level in 2005 and became a Group 2 event in 2015.

Records
Record time:
1:47.41 - Barney Roy (2020)

Most wins by a jockey:
 6 - Christophe Soumillon 2012, 2013, 2014, 2015, 2016, 2019

Most wins by a trainer:
 8 - Mike de Kock 2004, 2005, 2009, 2012, 2013, 2014, 2015, 2016

Most wins by an owner:
 9 - Godolphin 2003, 2010, 2017, 2018, 2019, 2020, 2021, 2022, 2023

Winners

See also
 List of United Arab Emirates horse races

References

Racing Post:
 

Horse races in the United Arab Emirates
Recurring sporting events established in 2002
Nad Al Sheba Racecourse
2002 establishments in the United Arab Emirates